Derebail is a locality, situated about 6 kilometres from the heart of Mangalore city.

Derebail spans over 5 corporate wards in the Mangalore City Corporation (Wards no. 17, 23, 24, 25 and 26). The total official population in the region, comprising these 5 wards, according to the 2011 Census is 47,132.

Hollywood actress Freida Pinto hails from Derebail.

References 

Localities in Mangalore